A schema is a template in computer science used in the field of genetic algorithms that identifies a subset of strings with similarities at certain string positions. Schemata are a special case of cylinder sets, forming a basis for a product topology on strings. In other words, schemata can be used to generate a topology on a space of strings.

Description 
For example, consider binary strings of length 6. The schema 1**0*1 describes the set of all words of length 6 with 1's at the first and sixth positions and a 0 at the fourth position. The * is a wildcard symbol, which means that positions 2, 3 and 5 can have a value of either 1 or 0. The order of a schema is defined as the number of fixed positions in the template, while the defining length  is the distance between the first and last specific positions. The order of 1**0*1 is 3 and its defining length is 5. The fitness of a schema is the average fitness of all strings matching the schema. The fitness of a string is a measure of the value of the encoded problem solution, as computed by a problem-specific evaluation function.

Length
The length of a schema , called , is defined as the total number of nodes in the schema.  is also equal to the number of nodes in the programs matching .

Disruption
If the child of an individual that matches schema H does not itself match H, the schema is said to have been disrupted.

Propagation of schema
In evolutionary computing such as genetic algorithms and genetic programming, propagation refers to the inheritance of characteristics of one generation by the next. For example, a schema is propagated if individuals in the current generation match it and so do those in the next generation. Those in the next generation may be (but don't have to be) children of parents who matched it.

The Expansion and Compression Operators 
Recently schema have been studied using order theory.

Two basic operators are defined for schema: expansion and compression. The expansion maps a schema onto a set of words which it represents, while the compression maps a set of words on to a schema.

In the following definitions  denotes an alphabet,  denotes all words of length  over the alphabet ,  denotes the alphabet  with the extra symbol .  denotes all schema of length  over the alphabet  as well as the empty schema .
 

Where subscript  denotes the character at position  in a word or schema. When  then . For example, if ,  and  then .

If  then . For example, let  then .

Schemata can be partially ordered. For any  we say  if and only if . It follows that  is a partial ordering on a set of schemata from the reflexivity, antisymmetry and transitivity of the subset relation. For example, .
This is because .

The compression and expansion operators form a Galois connection, where  is the lower adjoint and  the upper adjoint.

The Schematic Completion and The Schematic Lattice 

For example, let .

The poset  always forms a complete lattice called the schematic lattice. 

The schematic lattice is similar to the concept lattice found in Formal concept analysis.

See also
Holland's schema theorem
Formal concept analysis

References

Genetic algorithms
Genetic programming